Welcome to America is an album by the rapper Schoolly D (Schooly D on the album cover), released in 1994 via Ruffhouse Records. It was a commercial disappointment. Two singles were released: “Welcome to America” and “Another Sign”.

Production
The album was created with the assistance of Ruffhouse's house band, and was recorded at Studio 4, in Philadelphia. Joe Nicolo helped to produce and mix Welcome to America.

The beat on "Wanna Get Dusted" is a slower version of the one used on "PSK What Does It Mean?"

Critical reception
Westword wrote that "the focus is on dark, bass-driven grooves that give the title track and chillingly effective street fables such as 'I Know You Want to Kill Me' an undeniable immediacy." Trouser Press deemed the album "a hardcore record that sounds miles better than any others Schoolly's made, strapped with psychedelic guitar, thundering bass grooves, tense rhythms, bits of horn, piano and sound effects." The Philadelphia Inquirer wrote that "the most interesting tracks on Welcome to America use creative drum-machine loops as well as live drums, wah-wah guitar and jazz piano to create tense, unusually rich textures that overshadow the narratives of 'No Good Nigga' and 'I Know You Want to Kill Me'."

Track listing
“Intro” – 1:14
“I Wanna Get Dusted” – 4:14
“I Know You Want to Kill Me” – 3:56
“Welcome to America” – 4:10
“Niggas Like Me” – 4:19
“Gangsta Trippin” – 4:37
“Gimme Your Shit Nigga” – 2:52
“No Good Nigga” – 3:46
“I Shot da Bitch” – 4:27
“Motherfuckin D” – 4:32
“Stop Frontin” – 4:22
“Peace of What” – 2:22
“Another Sign” – 4:31

Samples
"Gimme Your Shit Nigga"
"More Bounce to the Ounce" by Zapp
"Stop Frontin'"
"Latoya" by Just-Ice

References

1994 albums
Schoolly D albums
Ruffhouse Records albums